Barbara Young (born 9 February 1931, Brighouse, West Riding of Yorkshire) is an English actress. She is known for her role as the future Emperor Nero's mother, Agrippina, in the landmark 1976 BBC serial I, Claudius.

Biography
She also played Miss Scatcherd in the 1970 film of Jane Eyre, Eileen Clancy in the 1975 TV series Looking For Clancy, Dot Wilmington in the TV series Hazell, and appeared in On Giant's Shoulders for the BBC in 1979.

She played the long-running role of gossipy yet lovable Sadie Hargreaves Lloyd in soap opera Family Affairs. Sadie, a former theatre actress turned barmaid, was a key figure in the show from 1998 until 2005, making her one of the show's longest serving characters.

Young previously acted in soap opera Coronation Street in the early 1960s, 1980s and 1990s. In February 2007, she rejoined the cast of Coronation Street, an old friend of Rita Sullivan called Doreen Fenwick until December that year.

She appeared in two episodes of Midsomer Murders, the 1997 pilot episode The Killing at Badger's Drift and the 2006 episode Last Year's Model.

In 2008, she made a guest appearance in an episode of the long-running BBC comedy series Last of the Summer Wine, "Get Out of That, Then", as Bobby Ball's wife Florrie. Following the departure of Kathy Staff from the series in 2008, Young joined the regular cast as Nora Batty's sister, Stella.

She appeared in Hollyoaks playing as Mags (Nan to Scott Sabeka) from 10 – 13 April 2012.

She is the mother of the singer Liza Pulman and the actress Cory Pulman.

Filmography

References

External links 
 

1931 births
English soap opera actresses
English television actresses
Living people
People from Brighouse
Actresses from Yorkshire
British comedy actresses